The Phaneropterinae, the sickle-bearing bush crickets or leaf katydids, are a subfamily of insects within the family Tettigoniidae. Nearly 2,060 species in 85 genera throughout the world are known. They are also known as false katydids or round-headed katydids.

The name Phaneropterinae is based upon the Old World genus Phaneroptera (type species P. falcata), meaning "visible wing"; this refers to the exposed tips of the inner wings seen in many species, although some genera, notably in the tribes Barbitistini and Odonturini have become brachypterous.

Description
The legs of individuals in this subfamily vary from genus to genus, but, as in nearly all Orthoptera, the posterior (rear) legs are adapted to leaping, and as such are always much longer than other legs.

The Phaneropterinae are largely arboreal in habitat. The vast majority of species live in shrubs and trees, feeding on leaves and twigs. Some species might potentially cause significant damage, though usually superficial, when present in large numbers, but this is rare; they usually are solitary, unlike meadow grasshoppers, so much so that they seldom come to human notice.

The ovipositor and male genitalia vary according to the genus. The Phaneropterinae differ from other subfamilies of Tettigoniidae (and other Orthoptera) in their oviposition; their eggs are rarely deposited in the earth, but are either glued in double rows to twigs, or are inserted in the edges of leaves.

Taxonomy
The subfamily Phaneropterinae was first erected in 1838 by German zoologist Hermann Burmeister. , Orthoptera Species File lists the following tribes, subtribes, genus groups, and genera.

Acrometopini
Auth.: Brunner von Wattenwyl, 1878 – Europe, the Middle East, Africa

Acrometopa Fieber, 1853 
Altihoratosphaga Hemp, Voje, Heller & Hemp, 2010
Conchotopoda Karsch, 1887
Horatosphaga Schaum, 1853
Lamecosoma Ragge, 1960
Peronura Karsch, 1889
Peronurella Hemp, 2017
Prosphaga Ragge, 1960
Tenerasphaga Hemp, 2017

Amblycoryphini
Auth.: Brunner von Wattenwyl, 1878 – Americas, Africa

Barbitistini
Auth.: Jacobson, 1905 – Europe to central Asia

Catoptropterigini
Auth.: Massa, 2016 – Africa
Catoptropteryx Karsch, 1890
Griffinipteryx Massa, 2016

Ducetiini
Auth.: Brunner von Wattenwyl, 1878 – Africa, India, China, Indochina to Australia

Abaxisotima Gorochov, 2005
Agnapha Brunner von Wattenwyl, 1891
Ducetia Stål, 1874
Kuwayamaea Matsumura & Shiraki, 1908
Noia Walker, 1870
Paraducetia Gorochov & Kang, 2002
Paragnapha Willemse, 1923
Prohimerta Hebard, 1922
Shirakisotima Furukawa, 1963
Subibulbistridulous Shi, 2002

Dysoniini

Auth.: Rehn, 1950 – tropical Americas

Ectemnini
Auth.: Cadena-Castañeda, 2015 – tropical Americas
Ectemna Brunner von Wattenwyl, 1878
Euthyrrhachis Brunner von Wattenwyl, 1878

Elimaeini
Auth.: Brunner von Wattenwyl, 1891 – Asia

Ectadia Brunner von Wattenwyl, 1878
Elimaea Stål, 1874
Hemielimaea Brunner von Wattenwyl, 1878
Orthelimaea Karny, 1926

Holochlorini
Auth.: Brunner von Wattenwyl, 1878 – Africa, Asia-Pacific

Insarini
Auth.: Rehn, & Hebard, 1914 – tropical & subtropical Americas

Arethaea Stål, 1876
Brachyinsara Rehn & Hebard, 1914
Insara Walker, 1869
Psilinsara Hebard, 1932

Kevaniellini
Auth.: Massa, 2017 – eastern Africa
Kevaniella Chopard, 1954

Letanini
Auth.: Hebard, 1922 – Asia
Himertula Uvarov, 1940
Letana Walker, 1869

Microcentrini
Auth.: Brunner von Wattenwyl, 1878 – Americas

Mirolliini
Auth.: Brunner von Wattenwyl, 1878 – Asia
Amirollia Ingrisch, 2011
Deflorita Bolívar, 1906
Hemimirollia Ingrisch, 2011
Hueikaeana Ingrisch, 1998
Mirollia Stål, 1873

Morgeniini
Auth.: Karsch, 1890 - central and western Africa
Mangomaloba Sjöstedt, 1902
Morgenia Karsch, 1890

Odonturini
Auth.: Brunner von Wattenwyl, 1878 – Americas, Iberian peninsula, Africa, Pacific islands

Otiaphysini
Auth.: Karsch, 1889 - Africa
Debrona Walker, 1870
Drepanophyllum Karsch, 1890
Stenamblyphyllum Karsch, 1896
Tetraconcha Karsch, 1890

Pardalotini
Auth.: Brunner von Wattenwyl, 1878 - Africa
Pardalota Brunner von Wattenwyl, 1878
Poecilogramma Karsch, 1887

Percynini
Auth.: Cadena-Castañeda, 2015 – South America
Percyna Grant, 1964
Sictuna Walker, 1869

Phaneropterini
Auth.: Burmeister, 1838 – distributed worldwide

Phlaurocentrini
Auth.: Karsch, 1889 – Africa
Buettneria Karsch, 1889
Leiodontocercus Chopard, 1954
Phlaurocentrum Karsch, 1889

Phyllopterini
Auth.: Brunner von Wattenwyl, 1878

Plagiopleurini
Auth.: Brunner von Wattenwyl, 1878 – South America
Diplophyllus Saussure, 1859
Parableta Brunner von Wattenwyl, 1878
Plagiopleura Stål, 1873

Plangiopsidini
Auth.: Cadena-Castañeda, 2015 – Africa
Plangiola Bolívar, 1906
Plangiopsis Karsch, 1889

Poreuomenini
Auth.: Brunner von Wattenwyl, 1878 – Africa
Cestromoecha Karsch, 1893
Paraporeuomena Massa, 2018
Poreuomena Brunner von Wattenwyl, 1878

Preussiini
Auth.: Karsch, 1890 – Africa
Enochletica Karsch, 1896
Preussia Karsch, 1890
Weissenbornia Karsch, 1888

Pycnopalpini
Auth.: Cadena-Castañeda, 2014 – Central and South America

Scudderiini
Auth.: Brunner von Wattenwyl, 1878 – Americas

Steirodontini
Auth.: Brunner von Wattenwyl, 1878 – South America

Cnemidophyllum Rehn, 1917
Emsleyfolium Cadena-Castañeda, Mendes & Alves-Oliveira, 2016
Nicklephyllum Cadena-Castañeda, 2016
Steirodon Serville, 1831
Stilpnochlora Stål, 1873

Terpnistrini
Auth.: Brunner von Wattenwyl, 1878 – Africa, Sri Lanka
Diogena Brunner von Wattenwyl, 1878
Gelotopoia Brunner von Wattenwyl, 1891
Terpnistria Stål, 1873
Terpnistrioides Ragge, 1980
Tropidophrys Karsch, 1896

Trigonocoryphini
Auth.: Bei-Bienko, 1954 – Middle East, India, Malaysia
Cosmozoma Karsch, 1889
Megotoessa Karsch, 1889
Trigonocorypha Stål, 1873

Tylopsidini
Auth.: Brunner von Wattenwyl, 1878 – Africa, Europe, Middle East, western Asia

Tylopsis Fieber, 1853

Vossiini
Auth.: Cadena-Castañeda, 2015 – Africa, Asia

Zeuneriini

Auth.: Karsh, 1890 - tropical Africa
Gravenreuthia Karsch, 1892
Zeuneria Karsch, 1889

Genus groups
Subtribe Trachyzulphina Gorochov, 2014 – China, Indochina, Malesia
Trachyzulpha Dohrn, 1892

Genus groups include:

Incertae sedis
These genera have not been placed in a tribe:

References

External links

 
Orthoptera subfamilies